Kirnbach may refer to:

Kirnbach (Wolfach), a village in Baden-Württemberg, Germany
Kirnbach (Kinzig), a river in Baden-Württemberg, Germany, tributary of the Kinzig
Kirnbach (Schiltach), a river in Baden-Württemberg, Germany, tributary of the Schiltach